Greenville is a city in and the county seat of Washington County, Mississippi, United States. The population was 34,400 at the 2010 census. It is located in the area of historic cotton plantations and culture known as the Mississippi Delta.

History

Early history
This area was occupied by indigenous peoples for thousands of years. When the French explored here, they encountered the historic Natchez people. As part of their colony known as La Louisiane, the French established a settlement at what became Natchez, Mississippi. Other Native American tribes also lived in what is now known as Mississippi.

The current city of Greenville is the third in the State to bear the name. The first, (known as Old Greenville) located to the south near Natchez, became defunct soon after the American Revolution, as European-American settlement was then still concentrated in the eastern states.

The second Greenville was founded in 1824 by American William W. Blanton, who filed for land from the United States government. He was granted section four, township eighteen, range eight west. This plot now constitutes most of downtown Greenville. It was named by its founders for General Nathanael Greene, friend of President George Washington, for whom the county was named.

Many migrants came to the area from the eastern and Upper South states, seeking land for developing cotton plantations. In 1830 the United States Congress passed the Indian Removal Act, which authorized the government to make treaties to extinguish Native American land claims in exchange for lands west of the Mississippi River. They forced most of the Southeastern tribes to Indian Territory during the following decade.

The second town was thriving hamlet in the antebellum years, as cotton plantations developed in the area generated high profits for major planters. They built their wealth on the labor of enslaved African Americans.

Greenville was designated as the county seat in 1844. It had become a trading center for the region's plantations. The two previous county seats, New Mexico and Princeton, had also been located along the Mississippi River, and had been eroded by the waters, to the point that they were destroyed. As county seat, it was the trading, business, and cultural center for the large cotton plantations that surrounded it. Most plantations were located directly on the Mississippi and other major navigable tributaries. The interior bottomlands were not developed until after the Civil War.

The destruction of Greenville and the Civil War
The town was destroyed during the Union Army's actions related to the siege of Vicksburg. Troops from a Union gunboat landed at Greenville. In retaliation for being fired upon, they burned every building. The inhabitants took refuge in plantation homes of the area. When the war ended, veterans of Mississippi regiments returned to find Greenville in a state of ruin.

 The former residents soon decided to build again. They chose a new site three miles away, at the highest point on the Mississippi River between the towns of Vicksburg and Memphis. Much of the land belonged to the Roach and Blanton families; the major part of the area selected was within property owned by Mrs. Harriet Blanton Theobald. She welcomed the idea of a new Greenville, and donated land for schools, churches and public buildings. She was called the "Mother of Greenville". Major Richard O’Hea, who had planned the wartime defense fortifications at Vicksburg, was hired to lay out the new town.

Greenville recovered prosperity, still based on cotton, despite the decline in world markets for this commodity. In the early 20th century, its elite families had considerable political influence in the state, and US Senator Leroy Percy was from here. Several residences and other buildings from the late 19th and early 20th centuries have been listed on the National Register of Historic Places. It was a center of Delta culture in the early 20th century.  This city adapted the former site to serve as industrial fill.

Nelson Street 

African Americans in the Delta developed rich varieties of innovative music. Nelson Street is a historic strip of blues clubs that drew crowds in the 1940s and 1950s to the flourishing club scene to hear Delta blues, big band, jump blues and jazz. Record companies came to Greenville to recruit talent. It was similar to Beale Street in  mid-20th century Memphis.

In the early 21st century, the Mississippi Blues Commission was established to commemorate this music in the state's history and culture. It has identified sites throughout the Delta as part of the Mississippi Blues Trail.

Southern Whispers Restaurant on Nelson Street in Greenville was the second site identified on this trail; this was a stop on the Chitlin' Circuit in the early days of the blues. The historic marker in front of the restaurant commemorates its importance in the history of the blues in Mississippi.

21st century
In 2020 the city ordered churches to shut down to prevent the spread of COVID-19 and issued citations and fines to those attending a drive-in church gathering. The U.S. Justice Department intervened on behalf of the church.

Geography

Greenville is located on the eastern bank of Lake Ferguson, an oxbow lake left from an old channel of the Mississippi River.

One floating casino is located on the lake near the downtown area known as the Trop Casino Greenville, with a second just west of the city near the Greenville Bridge known as Harlow's Casino Resort. Chicago Mill and Lumber Co. operated a lumber mill on the lake two-tenths of a mile south of the casino levee parking lot; the mill specialized in making hardwood boxes until it closed.

Climate

Demographics

2020 census

As of the 2020 United States Census, there were 29,670 people, 12,142 households, and 7,405 families residing in the city.

2013 ACS
As of the 2013 American Community Survey, there were 33,928 people living in the city. 75.9% were African American, 21.7% White, 0.0% Native American, 0.8% Asian, 0.9% from some other race and 0.7% from two or more races. 1.2% were Hispanic or Latino of any race.

2000 census
As of the census of 2000, there were 41,633 people, 18,784 households, and 14,422 families living in the city. The population density was 1,548.8 people per square mile (598.0/km). There were 16,251 housing units at an average density of 604.6 per square mile (233.4/km). The racial makeup of the city was 28.92% White, 69.60% Black, 0.07% Native American, 0.71% Asian, 0.01% Pacific Islander, 0.20% from other races, and 0.49% from two or more races. Hispanic or Latino of any race were 0.71% of the population.

There were 14,784 households, out of which 35.8% had children under the age of 18 living with them, 37.8% were married couples living together, 27.7% had a female householder with no husband present, and 29.5% were non-families. Of all households, 25.8% were made up of individuals, and 10.4% had someone living alone who was 65 years of age or older. The average household size was 2.77 and the average family size was 3.34.

In the city, the population was spread out, with 31.4% under the age of 18, 10.1% from 18 to 24, 26.3% from 25 to 44, 20.5% from 45 to 64, and 11.8% who were 65 years of age or older. The median age was 32 years. For every 100 females, there were 85.4 males. For every 100 females age 18 and over, there were 77.5 males.

The median income for a household in the city was $25,928, and the median income for a family was $30,788. Males had a median income of $29,801 versus $20,707 for females. The per capita income for the city was $13,992. About 25.7% of families and 29.6% of the population were below the poverty line, including 38.2% of those under age 18 and 23.6% of those age 65 or over.

1990 census 
As of the census of 1990, there were 45,226 people living in the city. The racial makeup of the city was 59.41% (26,867) Black or African American, 39.54% (17,881) White, 0.08% (37) Native American, 0.41% (185) Asian, and 0.01% (4) from other races. 0.56% (252) were Hispanic or Latino of any race.

Transportation

Air 
Greenville Mid Delta Regional Airport, located in unincorporated Washington County, northeast of downtown Greenville, serves the city and the Mississippi Delta region. Commercial passenger air service is currently provided by Contour Airlines with nonstop Embraer regional jet flights to Dallas/Fort Worth (DFW) and Nashville (BNA).

Highway 
U.S. Highway 82, U.S. Highway 61 and the Great River Road (Mississippi Highway 1) are the main transportation arteries through the Greenville area. U.S. Highway 82 is a major part of the Mississippi Delta's transportation network, as it connects to Interstate 55 and other major four-lane highways. In addition, the U.S. Highway 82 bypass is being constructed to provide a transportation route at the southern end of the Delta, connecting at the new Mississippi River Bridge and ending near Leland.  The four-lane Greenville Bridge, a $206 million cable-stayed span crossing the Mississippi River into Arkansas, opened in 2010, replacing the two-lane Benjamin G. Humphreys Bridge, which opened in 1940.

Rail 
The Columbus and Greenville Railway operates the Greenwood–Greenville rail line for freight traffic. North of Greenville, the Great River Railroad's line to Rosedale branches off.

Economy

Circa 2008 there were ten grocery stores operated by ethnic Chinese people. There were 42 such stores in the city in 1951, but since then there had been a flight of ethnic Chinese from the Delta.

Education
Most of Greenville is served by the Greenville Public School District, while a small portion of the city lies in the Western Line School District. Greenville High School is the public high school of the Greenville district, while O'Bannon High School serves Western Line residents.

The private schools, Washington School and Greenville Christian School, also serve the city, as well as St. Joseph Catholic School (K-12), a parochial school which is part of the Roman Catholic Diocese of Jackson. The diocese formerly operated Our Lady of Lourdes Elementary School, which merged into St. Joseph in 2016.

The Greenville Higher Education Center offers non-credit community courses and credit courses from Delta State University, Mississippi Delta Community College (MDCC), and Mississippi Valley State University. All of Washington County is in the service area of MDCC.

Media
Delta Democrat Times is the daily newspaper of the town.

Sports
The Greenville Bucks were a minor-league baseball team in the Cotton States League from 1922 to 1955.

The Greenville Bluesmen were an independent minor league professional baseball team from 1996–2001 in Greenville.

The Mississippi Miracles, formerly the Mississippi Stingers, were an American Basketball Association franchise from 2004–2006 in Greenville.

Greenville will become host to a mega-sports complex for young athletes.

Sites

The Winterville Mounds Historic Site, with more than twelve earthwork mounds constructed by people of the Plaquemine Mississippian culture, is a survival north of the county seat of the deep indigenous history along the Mississippi River. This culture was particularly prominent from 13th to the 15th centuries, long before European exploration. Earthwork mounds were built by peoples in this area from the 9th century. The people in this region were influenced by the larger Mississippian culture, which built similar ceremonial sites throughout the Mississippi Valley and its tributaries. The historic Natchez people are considered the only contemporary surviving group of the Mississippian culture at the time of European exploration.

The Winterville Mounds has been designated as a state park and National Historic Landmark. A museum on the grounds displays artifacts recovered in professional excavations and adds to the interpretation of this complex, and the park has walking trails. It is located about 3 miles north of the city. It can be reached at 2415 Highway 1 N.

In popular culture
The movies Crossroads (1986) and The Reivers (1969) were filmed in Greenville.
Also, the 1975 song "Mississippi" by the Dutch band Pussycat mentions Greenville throughout the song.

The movie Django Unchained (2012) is set in Greenville for some scenes.

Notable people

Born in Greenville 
 Quentin Groves, (1984–2016) was an American football linebacker, drafted by the Jacksonville Jaguars in the second round of the 2008 NFL. Groves was a sack specialist at Auburn and finished tied for the Auburn career sack record at 26.
 Steve Azar, country singer
 Heather McTeer Toney, former Mayor of Greenville and EPA regional administrator.
 John Colbert, a.k.a. J Blackfoot, Soul singer with the Bar-Kays and Soul Children, was born in Greenville.
 Eden Brent, blues boogie-woogie musician, composer, and performer
 Vivian Brown, meteorologist for The Weather Channel
 Charles Chew, (1922–1986), Illinois state senator; born in Greenville
 Tommy Davidson, actor/comedian
 Ross Davis, Negro league baseball player
 Tyrone Davis, blues musician
 Johnny Dollar, (1941–2006), Chicago blues guitarist, singer and songwriter
 Shelby Foote, author and historian
 Jimmie Giles, NFL tight end, four-time Pro Bowl selection in the 1980s with Tampa Bay Buccaneers
 Brooks Haxton, poet and professor at Syracuse University
 Robert T. Henry, World War II soldier and Medal of Honor recipient
 Jim Henson, (1936–1990), puppeteer, television and film producer, creator of The Muppets
 Corey Holmes, all-star Canadian Football League player and Mayor of Metcalfe, Mississippi
 Lucy Somerville Howorth, feminist and New Deal lawyer
 Carla Hughes, convicted of murdering Avis Banks and her  unborn baby.
 Antonio Johnson, NFL player for the Indianapolis Colts
 Germany Kent, model and media personality
Cornelia Lampton, pianist
 Sam Chu Lin, pioneering Chinese American journalist
 John Ramsey Miller, writer and journalist
 Wilbert Montgomery, former NFL running back, member of Philadelphia Eagles Hall of Fame
 The Percy family, including U.S. Senator Le Roy Percy and his son, author William Alexander Percy, lived here. They directed efforts to prevent and recover from the Great Mississippi Flood of 1927. The younger Percy wrote a memoir, Lanterns on the Levee about the Mississippi Delta culture. Walker Percy, another writer from the Percy family, and his brothers were raised by William Alexander Percy here after being orphaned. He lived most of his life in Louisiana.
 Julia Evans Reed, author, journalist and columnist
 George Scott, MLB player for Boston Red Sox, Milwaukee Brewers, Kansas City Royals and New York Yankees
 Carol Schwartz, former member of Council of the District of Columbia
 Nellie Nugent Somerville, first woman elected to Mississippi Legislature, mother of Lucy Somerville Howorth
 LaToya Thomas, former professional basketball player in WNBA, first round draft pick of Cleveland Rockers
 Walter Turnbull, African American musician, founder of Boys Choir of Harlem, as well as a Mississippi Musicians Hall of Fame inductee, was born in Greenville in 1944
 Frank White, professional baseball player
 Mary Wilson, singer of The Supremes
 Malcolm Wynn, first black police chief of Greenville Police Department
 Kelvin Jones, director of the LSU Tiger Band and first African American head athletic band director in SEC history

Greenville-related 
 Ray Brown, NFL football player 
 Hodding Carter, Pulitzer Prize-journalist, managed the city's Delta Democrat Times. His descendant Hodding Carter III, also a journalist, lived and worked here during and after the civil rights movement.
 Holt Collier is buried in Greenville. Collier was an African-American bear hunter and sportsman; he served as the guide for President Theodore Roosevelt on a bear hunt in Sharkey County. In January 2004 the Holt Collier National Wildlife Refuge was established on Collier's "historic hunting grounds" south of Greenville.
Samuel Gibbs French (1818-1910), Confederate Major General, managed a plantation in Greenville
 John F. Harris, Mississippi State Representative from Greenville elected in 1890.
 Clarke Reed, Mississippi state Republican chairman from 1966 to 1976, was instrumental in the nomination of Gerald R. Ford, Jr., at the 1976 Republican National Convention, has resided in Greenville since 1950; he is a businessman and investor.
 Thomas R. Yarborough, first Black city councilman in California

Sister cities
  Kronach, Bavaria, Germany, since 2006
  Greenville, Liberia, since 2009

See also 

List of municipalities in Mississippi

References

External links

 City of Greenville
 Delta Democrat-Times
 History of Greenville's Jewish community (from the Institute of Southern Jewish Life)
 

Greenville, Mississippi
1870 establishments in Mississippi
Cities in Washington County, Mississippi
County seats in Mississippi
Micropolitan areas of Mississippi
Mississippi Blues Trail
Mississippi populated places on the Mississippi River
Planned cities in the United States
Populated places established in 1870